The 1990 Stanford Cardinal football team represented Stanford University in the 1990 NCAA Division I-A football season.

Schedule

Roster

Season summary

at Colorado

Source: Box score

at Notre Dame

 Source:

at California

    
    
    
    
    
    
    
    
    
    
    

Glyn Milburn 24 Rush, 196 Yds, 9 Rec, 66 Yds

References

Stanford
Stanford Cardinal football seasons
Stanford Cardinal football